Chopped & Screwed is a compilation album by MC Breed featuring his greatest hits chopped and screwed. It was released on July 30, 2002 for Ichiban Records and was produced by MC Breed, Ant Banks, Warren G, Jazze Pha, Swift C, Carlos Glover, Colin Wolfe, Erotic D and the 281 Boys.

Track listing
"Gotta Get Mine" 5:06 (Featuring 2Pac) 
"Conclusions"- 5:11 (Featuring Jazze Pha, Too Short) 
"Dreamin'"- 5:51  
"Everyday Ho"- 4:34  
"Flatline"- 3:32  
"Game for Life"- 3:52  
"Real MC"- 4:50  
"Rule #1"- 4:19 (Featuring Pimp C, Jazze Pha) 
"7 Years"- 4:55  
"Sea of Bud"- 7:08 (Featuring Too Short) 
"Tight"- 6:27  
"Watcha Mad At"- 4:31

MC Breed albums
Chopped and screwed albums
Albums produced by Jazze Pha
2002 remix albums
2002 compilation albums